Agustín Ramírez Sánchez (August 28, 1952 – October 26, 2022) was a Mexican singer-songwriter, co-founder and frontman of the Mexican musical group Los Caminantes.

Ramírez composed and was responsible for many of Los Caminantes' hits, including, "Palomita Mensajera," "Para Que Quieres Volver," "Regresare,"  "He Sabido," "Volar, Volar,"  "Ven y Abrazame,"  "Una Noche,"  "Todo Me Gusta De Ti,"  "Mi Niña," "Lagrimas Al Recordar," etc.

Ramírez also composed songs for groups such as El Tiempo, Los Sagitarios, El Jefe y Su Grupo, and in 1990, composed a ballad for the tropical group Los João called, "Una Noche Mas Sin Ti."

In 1993, Agustín Ramírez received an honorary plaque award which was placed outside a wall of his hometown of San Pancho by the mayor. The mayor of that time wanted to honor Agustín for his achievements, recognition and pride of San Pancho, Mexico, and Latin America.

In 2016, Agustín gave vocals for "Para Que Quieres Volver" on a recorded track to La Rondalla Tradicional de Saltillo in an album titled, La Razón de Mi Existir.

Childhood and early life
Born in San Francisco del Rincón, Guanajuato, Mexico, Agustín attended Seminario "Misioneros de María Niña" (an all-boys Catholic prep school), where he sang in the choir along with his brother and fellow Los Caminantes member Brígido Ramírez.

Death

He died on October 26, 2022, at the age of 70.

References

External links
Official Website Los Caminantes
 
Agustín Ramírez on Facebook

 

1952 births
2022 deaths
Singers from Guanajuato
Writers from Guanajuato
Mexican male singer-songwriters
Mexican singer-songwriters
People from San Francisco del Rincón